The 2020–21 Adelaide United FC season is the club's 16th season since its establishment in 2003. The club will participate in the A-League for the 15th time. The club will not compete in the 2020 FFA Cup due to the event being cancelled following the COVID-19 pandemic in Australia.

Players

Squad information

Transfers

Transfers in

Transfers out

From youth squad

Contract extensions

Technical staff

Pre-season and friendlies

Competitions

Overview
{|class="wikitable" style="text-align:left"
|-
!rowspan=2 style="width:140px;"|Competition
!colspan=8|Record
|-
!style="width:30px;"|
!style="width:30px;"|
!style="width:30px;"|
!style="width:30px;"|
!style="width:30px;"|
!style="width:30px;"|
!style="width:30px;"|
!style="width:50px;"|
|-
|A-League

|-
|A-League Finals

|-
!Total

A-League

League table

Results summary

Results by round

Matches
On 24 November 2020, the A-League fixtures for the season were announced. Due to having 26 rounds in a 12 team league, Adelaide will play against Melbourne Victory, Perth Glory, Sydney FC and Western Sydney Wanderers three times.

Finals series

Statistics

Appearances and goals
Players with no appearances not included in the list.

Goalscorers

Disciplinary record

Clean sheets

Notes

References

Adelaide United FC seasons
2020–21 A-League season by team